Silver Lake is an unincorporated community in Van Zandt County, Texas, United States. According to the Handbook of Texas, the community had a population of 42 in 2000. It is located within the Dallas/Fort Worth Metroplex.

History
The area in what is known as Silver Lake today was first settled as early as 1845. A man named John Jordan surveyed the land and secured title to 30 square miles that covered the salt flats along the Sabine River. This prompted the community to become a station on the Texas and Pacific Railway in 1873 when a depot was built. That same year, G.W. Rive opened a store here. It was named for nearby Silver Lake, which was named either for its silvery appearance or because Native Americans or Mexican settlers in the area hid silver in the lake between 1832 and 1836 to prevent the Texas army from capturing them. On May 7, 1874, Grenville M. Dodge purchased a land grant here and platted it on March 5, 1875. A post office was established at Silver Lake in 1874 and remained in operation until the 1930s. A Grange chapter was then founded here in 1876. A Farmer's Alliance was also established in the community. Silver Lake had a population of 80 in 1914 and had a general store and several businesses. Only a few scattered houses were reported in 1936. During that decade, coal miners came to the area. The population went down to 50 in 1940, then to 42 from 1974 through 2000. It had another post office, a cemetery, several businesses, and scattered houses in 1988.

Geography

Education
Silver Lake had its own school in 1890 and had 43 students in 1904. Since 1952, the community has been served by the Grand Saline Independent School District.

References

Unincorporated communities in Van Zandt County, Texas
Unincorporated communities in Texas